This is a list of electoral results for the electoral district of Mount Lawley in Western Australian state elections.

Members for Mount Lawley

Election results

Elections in the 2020s

Elections in the 2010s

Elections in the 2000s

Elections in the 1980s

 Preferences were not distributed.

Elections in the 1970s

Elections in the 1960s

Elections in the 1950s

References

Western Australian state electoral results by district